Josep Roca i Fontané (born 1966, Girona, Spain) is the sommelier of the restaurant El Celler de Can Roca.

Acknowledgments 
 2002. Second Michelin Star for El Celler de Can Roca.
 2009. Third Michelin Star for El Celler de Can Roca. and 5h position in the Restaurant Magazine
 2011. Second best restaurant in the world for El Celler de Can Roca, by the Restaurant Magazine.
 2012. Second best restaurant in the world for El Celler de Can Roca, by the Restaurant Magazine.
 2013. Best restaurant in the world for El Celler de Can Roca, by the Restaurant Magazine.
 2022. Beronia World's Best Sommelier Award, by The World's 50 Best Restaurants.

Publications
El Celler de Can Roca, by Joan, Josep and Jordi Roca. In Catalan, Spanish and English.

See also 
 Haute cuisine

References

External links 
 Josep Roca Biography
 Josep Roca Interview

1966 births
Living people
People from Girona